McLaine is a surname. Notable people with the surname include:

Darren McLaine (born 1961), Australian rules footballer
Ed McLaine ( 1899–1972), Scottish-Canadian soccer player
William McLaine (1891–1960), British trade unionist

See also
MacLaine
McLain
McLane